Jariyan Al Batnah (also spelled Jariyan Al Butna) is a village and former municipality of Qatar. Its territory was split between the municipalities of Al Wakrah and Al Rayyan in 2004. All of Jariyan Al Batnah's districts recorded in the 2004 census – Al Karaana, Rawdat Rashed, Sawda Natheel, and Abu Samra – were distributed to the municipality of Al Rayyan thereafter. The village of Jariyan Al Batnah was also shifted to within Al Rayyan's boundaries, in Zone 83.

The Persian Gulf bordered Jariyan Al Batnah in its west and its southeast. It used to be the only municipality to border foreign territory: Saudi Arabia's Ash Sharqiyah province.

Etymology
The word 'jeriyan' is the plural of 'jeri', which itself is derived from the Arabic word 'qeri', referring to a place where water flows freely and which accommodates a variety of plant life. 'Batnah' originates from the local term 'batn', which translates to 'inside of'. This name was given on account of the village being built in a depression surrounded by jeris.

As a municipality

The following table shows the population of Jariyan Al Batnah.

The following table shows the registered live births by nationality and sex for this municipality. Place of births is based on home municipality of mother at birth.

References

Populated places in Al Rayyan